Aloe aculeata (common names include ngopanie, sekope, red hot poker aloe) is an Aloe species that is native to the Limpopo valley and Mpumalanga in South Africa along with southern and central Zimbabwe and Mozambique. It grows on rocky outcrops in grassland and dry bushveld. Aculeata ("prickly") refers to the spines on the leaf's surface and the teeth on its margins.

Aloe aculeata was depicted on the reverse of the South African 10 cent coin from 1965-1989. The plant can also be viewed in the Gibraltar Botanic Gardens.

References

External links
 Kew Plant List
 IPNI Listing
 Photos from Huntington Botanical Garden

aculeata
Flora of Zimbabwe
Flora of Mozambique
Flora of Botswana
Flora of the Northern Provinces
Plants described in 1915